Mosenthal is a surname. Notable people with the surname include:

 Joseph Mosenthal (1834–1896), German-American musician
 Salomon Hermann Mosenthal (1821–1877), writer, dramatist, and poet